Newport is a civil parish in the district of Telford and Wrekin, Shropshire, England.  It contains 106 listed buildings that are recorded in the National Heritage List for England.  Of these, four are at Grade II*, the middle of the three grades, and the others are at Grade II, the lowest grade.  The parish contains the town of Newport and the surrounding area.  Most of the listed buildings lie on the north–south axis of the main roads running through the town.  A high proportion of the listed buildings are houses and associated structures, cottages, shops, public houses and hotels.  Some of the older buildings are timber framed, and others have timber framed cores with later encasement or rebuilding.  The other listed buildings include churches and associated structures, a memorial cross, bridges, schools, almshouses, a folly, and a war memorial.


Key

Buildings

References

Citations

Sources

Lists of buildings and structures in Shropshire